Countdown is a 2019 American supernatural horror film directed and written by Justin Dec, and starring Elizabeth Lail, Jordan Calloway, Talitha Bateman, Tichina Arnold, P.J. Byrne, Peter Facinelli, Anne Winters, and Tom Segura. The plot follows a group of people who discover a mobile app that correctly tells its users when they are going to die.

Countdown was theatrically released in the United States on October 25, 2019, by STX Entertainment. It received negative reviews from critics but grossed $48 million worldwide against a $6.5 million budget, becoming a commercial success.

Plot
At a party, teenager Courtney is convinced by her friends to download Countdown, an app that seemingly predicts how long a user has left to live. Courtney is startled to see it says she only has 3 hours left to live. After avoiding getting into a car with her drunk boyfriend Evan, Courtney receives a notification stating she has broken the "user agreement". Returning home, she is attacked by an unseen entity and killed as her timer reaches zero. At the same time, Evan crashes his car and a tree branch impales the seat where Courtney would have been sitting.

Quinn Harris, a nurse who works at the hospital where Evan is admitted, dismisses his claims of a supernatural app, but subsequently downloads it only for it to claim that she has only two days left to live. Evan skips his surgery and is informed he has violated the user agreement. He tries escaping the hospital, but is confronted by an apparition of Courtney before being killed by the entity.

When Quinn finds out that Evan has died, she checks his phone, which indicates no time left in the app. Concerned that she will die in the next day, Quinn declines to go out with her family. The app informs her that she has violated the user agreement. Shortly afterward, her boss Dr. Sullivan sexually harasses her and thwarts her attempt to report his offense to her supervisor. When Quinn researches the app, she finds that similar deaths have supposedly occurred involving other users, but the public generally considers them to be fake. She attempts to buy a new phone, but finds that Countdown has downloaded itself onto it.

After being attacked by a demonic figure, Quinn meets a young man named Matt, whose Countdown states he will die in 18 hours. They learn that the user agreement is broken if the user tries changing their fate: Quinn's trip with her family and Matt taking a train ride, which they both canceled, should have resulted in their original deaths. At work, Quinn learns Sullivan has tricked the staff into thinking she sexually harassed him, resulting in her suspension. She and Matt consult a priest named Father John, who informs them that the app is linked to a demon named Ozhin who was originally summoned by a Roma woman who told a prince when he would die. Cell phone salesman Derek hacks into the app code and identifies that Quinn's younger sister, Jordan, was meant to die shortly before Quinn, then adds several decades to Quinn, Jordan's, and Matt's lives. However, while Matt and Quinn spend the night together, the entity takes the form of Matt and attacks Quinn. To their shock, their countdowns, including Jordan's, reset to their original lifespans.

Jordan receives a notification of her countdown changing to the original lifespan and is then terrorized by a demonic form of her and Quinn's deceased mother. Quinn and Matt rescue her and return to Father John, who theorizes the curse can be broken if someone dies before their countdown ends or lives for beyond the countdown. They prepare a warding circle in an attempt to delay Ozhin. The demon arrives and the circle initially wards off the group, until it suddenly lures them outside, killing Matt and wounding Jordan in the process. While in grief over Matt's fate,  Jordan starts having serious abdominal pain. Realizing her sister is seriously hurt, Quinn rushes Jordan to the hospital. Once there, she realizes she can kill Sullivan before his allotted time and end the curse. She attempts to attack him, but he is saved by Ozhin, who simultaneously prepares to kill Jordan. Quinn overdoses on drugs, sacrificing herself for Jordan before her timer ends and proving the app wrong. With instructions that Quinn gave her, Jordan revives her sister with Naloxone and their countdown timers stop. Some time later, while visiting her and Jordan's mother's grave, Quinn receives word of Sullivan's arrest after more nurses have come forward, but discovers that an app called Countdown 2.0 has downloaded itself onto her phone, much to the sisters' horror.

Cast
 Elizabeth Lail as Quinn Harris, a newly appointed registered nurse and Jordan's older sister.
 Jordan Calloway as Matt Monroe, a young man whom Quinn meets at the phone store and team up to defeat Ozhin.
 Talitha Bateman as Jordan Harris, Quinn's younger sister, who joins Quinn and Matt to fight against the demon, Ozhin.
 Tichina Arnold as Nurse Amy, the head of the hospital where Quinn works.
 P. J. Byrne as Father John, a demon enthusiast who tries to help Quinn, Matt, and Jordan face Ozhin.
 Peter Facinelli as Dr. Sullivan, Quinn's boss.
 Anne Winters as Courtney, Evan's girlfriend.
 Matt Letscher as Charlie Harris, the widowed father of Quinn and Jordan.
 Dillon Lane as Evan, Courtney's boyfriend.
 Tom Segura as Derek, a tech worker who can hack apps, including Countdown.
 Charlie McDermott as Scott
 Christina Pazsitzky as Krissy
 Jeannie Elise Mai as Allie
 Marisela Zumbado as Kate
 Valente Rodriguez as Father David

Production
Elizabeth Lail was cast in the film's leading role in March 2019. In April 2019, it was announced that Talitha Bateman, Peter Facinelli, Jordan Calloway, Tom Segura, P. J. Byrne, Anne Winters and Tichina Arnold had also joined the cast.

Danny Bensi and Saunder Jurriaans composed the film's score. The soundtrack was released by Sony Classical Records.

Release
Countdown was theatrically released in the United States on October 25, 2019. The film's trailer premiered on September 13, 2019. STX Entertainment reportedly spent under $15 million promoting the film. The studio partnered with Amp Studios, run by YouTuber Brent Rivera, to promote the film on social media apps such as TikTok.

After watching the trailer, developer Ryan Boyling built and uploaded a random generator death app that looks exactly like the one in the film. The app is available on both iOS and Android platforms and climbed to the number one spot in the App Store charts in October 2019.

Home media
The film was released on January 7, 2020, by Universal Home Entertainment on DVD, Blu-ray and Digital HD. It was released on March 2, 2020, in the UK.

Reception

Box office
In the United States and Canada, Countdown was released alongside Black and Blue and The Current War, and was projected to gross around $5 million from 2,675 theaters in its opening weekend. The film made $3.1 million on its first day, including $515,000 from Thursday night previews. It went on to over-perform and debut to $9 million, finishing fifth. In its second weekend the film fell 35% to $5.8 million, finishing seventh.

Critical response
 On Metacritic, the film has a weighted average score of 31 out of 100, based on 16 critics, indicating "generally unfavorable reviews." Audiences polled by CinemaScore gave the film an average grade of "C+" on an A+ to F scale, while those surveyed at PostTrak gave it 3 out of 5 stars.

Benjamin Lee of The Guardian gave the film 1 out of 5 stars, calling it "a Halloween release devoid of tricks, treats and anything even vaguely close to an original idea", and criticized it for its similarities to other horror films, especially Final Destination. Dennis Harvey of Variety called it a "bombastically dumb new chiller that probably would have been called 'Killer App' if that title hadn't already been used several times."

Kimber Myers of the Los Angeles Times was more positive, writing: "This isn't a subtle, moody film filled with a sense of unease; instead, jump scares are around every corner. If that's all you want from a horror movie, you'll have a very good time - and an elevated heart rate for its speedy 90 minutes."

See also
 Final Destination (franchise)

References

External links
 
 
 

2019 horror films
2019 films
2010s supernatural horror films
American supernatural horror films
Demons in film
Films about mobile phones
Films produced by John Morris
STX Entertainment films
Films produced by Zack Schiller
2010s English-language films
2010s American films